Cathedral Secondary School is a Roman Catholic high school situated in Suva, the capital of Fiji. The school was founded in 1961.

Schools in Fiji
Educational institutions established in 1961